Liaocheng University is a comprehensive university located in Liaocheng City, Shandong Province, China.

History 
The university was established in 1974 as Shandong Teachers College (Liaocheng Branch). In 1981, the Liaocheng Branch was renamed to Liaocheng Teachers College. In 2002, after approval of the Ministry of Education, the university adopted its present name, Liaocheng University.

Administration 
The university is composed of the following faculties.

Faculty structure
 School of Chemistry and Chemical Engineering
 School of Literature
 School of Politics and Law
 School of Business
 School of History and Culture
 School of Foreign Languages
 School of Mathematics Science
 School of Physics Science and Information Engineering
 School of Education Science
 School of Physical Education
 School of Art
 School of Management
 School of Materials Science and Engineering
 School of Life Science
 School of Educational Technology and Mass Medium
 School of Environment and Planning
 School of Computer Science
 School of Agricultural Science
 School of Automobile and Transportation Engineering
 Dongchang College
 School of International Education
 College of Continual Education

References

External links
Liaocheng University

Educational institutions established in 1974
Universities and colleges in Shandong